is a retired male long-distance runner from Japan. He set his personal best (2:08:28) in the men's marathon event on March 2, 2003 at the Lake Biwa Marathon.

International competitions

Marathons

References

1969 births
Living people
Japanese male long-distance runners
Japanese male marathon runners
Asian Games medalists in athletics (track and field)
Athletes (track and field) at the 2002 Asian Games
World Athletics Championships athletes for Japan
Asian Games silver medalists for Japan
Medalists at the 2002 Asian Games